The Votic languages are a well-defined branch of Chibchan languages spoken in Costa Rica and Nicaragua. They are:
Rama southeastern Nicaragua, moribund
Voto Costa Rica, extinct
Maléku (Guatuso) north-central Costa Rica, endangered
Corobicí northwestern Costa Rica, extinct

References

Chibchan languages
Indigenous languages of Central America
Languages of Costa Rica
Languages of Nicaragua